"Sans logique" (English: "Without Logic") is a 1988 song recorded by French singer-songwriter Mylène Farmer. It was released on 20 February 1989 as the fourth and last single from her second studio album Ainsi soit je.... The song deals with schizophrenia, death, love and religion and was accompanied by a cinematic video which shows a human corrida. The single became a top ten hit in France.

Background and writing
After the successful songs "Sans contrefaçon" and "Pourvu qu'elles soient douces" and the huge sales of the parent album Ainsi soit je..., Farmer decided to release "Sans logique" as the fourth and last single from the album as she was preparing her first concert tour through France, Belgium and Switzerland. The B-side of the single, "Dernier Sourire", is a previously unavailable song about the death of a relative (though a live version of the cover "Je voudrais tant que tu comprennes", originally sung by Marie Laforêt, was first scheduled as the B-side).

"Sans logique" was actually recorded twice due to technical problems in the studio. The sentence "this is a blank formatted diskette" (sampled from an Ensoniq Mirage), which can be heard in the introduction of the song and later on, refers to this problem and was kept in the finished product. "Sans logique" was widely played on French radio during the year of its release was one of the top ten songs that yielded the most copyright royalties to the Société des auteurs, compositeurs et éditeurs de musique in 1989.

Shortly after the single's release, the European Workers Party used a still from the video, where Farmer has white eyes and the horns on her head, with the subtitle "These people promote ugliness and drugs! Say "No" to the media subculture; vote RFL!" Farmer sued the secretary of the party, Jacques Cheminade, accusing him of having used her image without her consent and have made inappropriate and abusive remarks towards her. The Tribunal de grande instance de Paris found in Farmer's favour.

Lyrics and music
The song deals with a kind of schizophrenia or dissociative identity disorder, which lives in the character that Farmer portrays, and also makes reference to religious concepts (angels and Satan) to explore the two opposite sides of one person. The calculating Marquise de Mertreuil (a character in the French epistolary novel Les Liaisons dangereuses), as both angelic as diabolical according to her own interests, seems to be evoked in the lyrics. The psychologist Hugues Royer said the lyrics, as well as the music video, show that "the identity, the sense of unity to achieve, remains problematic".

Music video

Production
The video (5:37) was directed by Laurent Boutonnat who has also written the screenplay with Gilles Laurent. It was a Requiem Publishing production, filmed over the course of three days at a studio in Arpajon in the Île-de-France région, France, where the video for "Que mon cœur lâche" was also shot three years later. It cost around 200,000 euros to make, largely due to Boutonnat importing two tons of earth and a large waxed cloth that was used to represent the sky. The video concept was inspired by Francisco Goya's painting El Aquelarre which portrays a human corrida, and features various people including a torero (played by Lilah Dadi who also appeared in the video for Farmer's next single, "À quoi je sers..."'). Due to its graphic, violent content, the video for "Sans logigue" was edited by some television channels for broadcast. The unedited version was released on Farmer's various video clips compilations.

Plot
The video begins with Farmer and her lover sat in the middle of a desolate, barren landscape on a grim cloudy day. As a snake slithers nearby, the pair cut their palms and rub their hands together to mix their blood. A little girl picks up a statue of Christ found in the mud and sticks it on a cross. Then several Gypsies, dressed in black clothes and veils, come to sit on a bench to watch a human bullfight. Farmer plays the "bull", as her hands are tied behind her back and iron horns are put on her head, and is thus forced to fight a torero who is her lover. The men take off their jackets and behave like toreros, and as Farmer runs through their coats like a raging bull, her lover puts a sword in her back. The man, believing the "bull" to be defeated, turns to his audience and celebrates his victory, and the gypsies cheer him and throw coins. Then, with her eyes rolled upwards and seemingly possessed by a demonic spirit, Farmer charges one last time and impales her lover with the iron horns on her head, fatally injuring him. While she becomes herself again, she attends to her dying lover, as it begins raining and the crowd of Gypsies disperse after their entertainment. The video ends with Farmer crying a tear of blood.

Influence, interpretation and reception

According to Instant-Mag, "Sans Logique" is without a doubt "one of the most beautiful videos of the singer: percussive images, multiple references, many interpretation, rich symbolism". It condenses "the strong themes of the filmmaker Luis Buñuel", particularly the social struggle. Like Goya's painting, the video "tackles the fundamental perversion of men; reality is described as obsessive and mixes dreams and nightmares". It is "built as an ode to the Spanish forbidden culture, in which mix the themes of childhood and social corruption". "The old characters that form the audience [in the video] represent affluent people, the guarantors of moral order, the partners of moral conformism". According to French magazine Top 50, the video manages to "marry dead, mournful, tragedy with music for discothèques", "by dint of symbols, sophisticated decors and subtle union of beauty and unhealthy." Biographer Bernard Violet said this video is "by far the most inventive" ever made by Boutonnat.

In this video, the singer shows that "she does not dating relationships without violence". Because of her pain, Farmer, who was innocent and naive at the beginning of the video, became then corrupted and began to kill. She "kills her lover to not be killed. The horns are a symbol of the bull (power, fertility and virile strength) granted to a woman, but also that of the Devil who takes possession of Farmer. Helpless, she is witness to the lover's agony, overwhelmed and very human". There are also several references to sexuality (the snake in the Garden of Eden, symbolism of the bullfight in the Spanish culture). The themes of love and death are also present in the video. For biographer Violet, all the people belong to the same community, the bullfighter was unfaithful by impregnating a pregnant woman seen in the video, and Farmer "wears horns" literally as she has been deceived by her lover, and ultimately takes revenge by killing him.

Belgian writer and Farmer's friend Amélie Nothomb, spoke of this video in an excerpt from her 1997 book Attentat, with her character Ethel.

Critical reception
France Soir considered that "Sans logique" had "its weight of synthetic sulfur" and that the words had "a preciousness from another era".

In France, the single charted for fifteen weeks on the French Top 50, from 18 March to 1 July 1989. It debuted at number 30 and reached its peaked position, number ten, five weeks later, spending a total of eleven weeks in the top twenty. Its sales were somewhat disappointing in comparison with the great success of two of the other three previous singles, "Sans contrefaçon" and "Pourvu qu'elles soient douces". On the European Hot 100 Singles, it debuted at number 68 on 1 April 1989, reached a peak of number 39 five weeks later, and fell off the chart after 14 weeks. Much played on radio, it charted for 12 weeks on the European Airplay Top 50, with a peak at number 20 for non consecutive two weeks.

Promotion and live performances
Farmer performed "Sans logique" five times in four television shows in 1989, all on TF1: Avis de recherche (24 February and 12 May), La Une est à vous (11 March), Jacky show (18 March), Sacrée Soirée (22 March). Farmer, nominated for the Victoires de la musique, has won the title "Best female performer of the year", but refused to sing "Sans logique", which was very criticized by the media. For this song, the singer used for the first time a dynamic choreography that she named "the technical of mirror", because she has created it only by looking at herself in a mirror.

"Sans logique" was performed during the 1989 tour. Farmer then wore black veils, a white collar and small white socks and performed a collective choreography inspired by the 18th century, composed of large gestures and these movements become smaller as if Farmer was bound by twine. When the music began, Farmer curtseyed several times, and the phrase "This is a blank formatted diskette" was repeated throughout the song. About the middle of the song, the singer hit the ground with her microphone and got up again immediately.
Awaited by fans since 30 years, "Sans Logique" was performed in her Live 2019 just after the opening song "Interstellaires", without choreography but in a version rearranged by the musical director of the show, Olivier Schultheis.

B-side: "Dernier Sourire"
The vinyl's B-side contains a new song, "Dernier Sourire", which is very sad. This moving song tackles the theme of the disappearance of a loved one. With simple words, Farmer evokes the passage of the state of living to that of death through a description an ill-person in the process of dying in a hospital room, and the injustice felt in this kind of situation. This song was probably composed for Max Gautier, Farmer's father, who died on 11 July 1986, and in the lyrics she tells him some things she had not had time to say when he was alive. About its structure, the song has "a classic accompaniment, a simple melody and no refrain". After being chosen instead of "Que mon cœur lâche" to feature on the 1992 album Urgence – 27 artistes pour la recherche contre le SIDA, the song was especially re-recorded in a new version, becoming the anthem of people who come at the end of life and appeared to be as "a kind of cruel poem about the end of life and the injustice of death which blows too quickly our candles". The song was generally well received, as stated by the author Erwan Chuberre who provides in one of his books positive critics from fans.

Farmer performed the song first on 1 November 1989 on French television show Sacrée Soirée on TF1. It was originally scheduled to be performed during the 1989 tour, but it was eventually replaced by "Puisque...". The song was sung during the Mylenium Tour; when performing on stage, Farmer wore a white transparent dress with a plunging neckline in the back, a sailing on the shoulders, shoes with high heels, and a white large necklace. There is no choreography, and when she sang for the second time the first verse at the end of the song, she began to cry; she was only accompanied by the piano. In 2000, this live version was the second track of the CD single for "Dessine-moi un mouton". "Dernier Sourire" was covered by Michał Kwiatkowski on a weekly program of Star Academy France, in 2003, but his version was not released as a single.

Formats and track listings
These are the formats and track listings of single releases of "Sans logique":

 7" single – France

 7" maxi / CD maxi – France

 7" maxi – Promo – France

 7" maxi – Promo – France

 7" single – Canada

 Digital download (since 2005)

Release history

Official versions

Credits and personnel
These are the credits and the personnel as they appear on the back of the single:
 Mylène Farmer – lyrics
 Laurent Boutonnat – music
 Bertrand Le Page / Toutankhamon – editions
 Polydor – recording company
 Marianne Rosentiehl – photo

Charts and sales

Weekly charts

Sales

References

Notes

External links
  Mylène Farmer — "Sans logique" All about the song, on Mylène.net

1988 songs
1989 singles
Mylène Farmer songs
Songs with lyrics by Mylène Farmer
Songs with music by Laurent Boutonnat
Music videos directed by Laurent Boutonnat
Polydor Records singles